The Minister for Veterans' Affairs is an Australian Government position. In the Government of Australia, the minister oversees income support, compensation, care and commemoration programs for more than 400,000 veterans and their widows, widowers and dependants; and administers the portfolio through the Department of Veterans' Affairs.

Scope
The minister is also responsible for the following agencies:
Australian War Memorial
Military Rehabilitation and Compensation Commission
Office of Australian War Graves
Repatriation Commission
Repatriation Medical Authority
Review of Service Delivery Arrangements
Specialist Medical Review Council
Veterans' Review Board
Vietnam Veterans Counselling Service

List of veterans' affairs ministers
The portfolio was created by Billy Hughes. It was called Minister for Repatriation from the appointment of the first Minister, Edward Millen on 28 September 1917 to deal with ex-soldiers returning from World War I. Stanley Bruce chose not to include a Minister for Repatriation in his ministry (1923–29), but his successor James Scullin restored it, and it has continued ever since, under different names. Gough Whitlam changed the portfolio title to Minister for Repatriation and Compensation in 1974; Malcolm Fraser restored it to its original title in 1975, and then changed it to Minister for Veterans' Affairs on 5 October 1976, Peter Durack being the last minister under the old title and the first under the new.

The following individuals have been appointed as Minister for Veterans' Affairs, or any of its precedent titles:

Notes
 Barnard was part of a two-man ministry that comprised Barnard and Gough Whitlam for fourteen days, until the full ministry was commissioned.
 Malcolm Fraser initially chose Senator Glen Sheil for the portfolio, and he was sworn in as a member of the Federal Executive Council. But before he was sworn in as a minister, Sheil professed his support for the South African apartheid regime, which was very much at odds with the Fraser government's position.  Fraser decided not to proceed with Sheil’s appointment to the Ministry, and his appointment as an Executive Councillor was terminated. Garland was appointed in his place.

List of assistant ministers

List of Ministers Assisting the Prime Minister for the Centenary of ANZAC

Ministers in charge of War Service Homes

Between 1932 and 1938 there was also a Minister in charge of War Service Homes.  This position was revived with Herbert Collett's appointment as Minister without portfolio administering War Service Homes in 1939, but was subsumed by Bert Lazzarini's appointment as Minister for Works and Housing in 1945.

The following individuals have been appointed as Minister in charge of War Service Homes, or any of its precedent titles:

References

External links
 

Veterans' Affairs
Australia
Veterans' affairs in Australia